This is a list of the mammal species recorded in the Central African Republic. There are 224 mammal species in the Central African Republic, of which four are endangered, eight are vulnerable, and nine are near threatened.

The following tags are used to highlight each species' conservation status as assessed by the International Union for Conservation of Nature:

Some species were assessed using an earlier set of criteria. Species assessed using this system have the following instead of near threatened and least concern categories:

Order: Afrosoricida (tenrecs and golden moles) 

The order Afrosoricida contains the golden moles of southern Africa and the tenrecs of Madagascar and Africa, two families of small mammals that were traditionally part of the order Insectivora.

Family: Tenrecidae (tenrecs)
Subfamily: Potamogalinae
Genus: Potamogale
 Giant otter shrew, Potamogale velox LC
Family: Chrysochloridae
Subfamily: Amblysominae
Genus: Calcochloris
 Congo golden mole, Calcochloris leucorhinus DD

Order: Macroscelidea (elephant shrews) 

Often called sengi, the elephant shrews or jumping shrews are native to southern Africa. Their common English name derives from their elongated flexible snout and their resemblance to the true shrews.

Family: Macroscelididae (elephant shrews)
Genus: Rhynchocyon
 Checkered elephant shrew, R. cirnei

Order: Hyracoidea (hyraxes) 

The hyraxes are any of four species of fairly small, thickset, herbivorous mammals in the order Hyracoidea. About the size of a domestic cat they are well-furred, with rounded bodies and a stumpy tail. They are native to Africa and the Middle East.

Family: Procaviidae (hyraxes)
Genus: Dendrohyrax
 Western tree hyrax, Dendrohyrax dorsalis LC

Order: Proboscidea (elephants) 

The elephants comprise three living species and are the largest living terrestrial animals.

Family: Elephantidae
Genus: Loxodonta
African bush elephant, L. africana 
African forest elephant, L. cyclotis

Order: Primates 

The order Primates contains humans and their closest relatives: lemurs, lorisoids, tarsiers, monkeys, and apes.

Suborder: Strepsirrhini
Infraorder: Lemuriformes
Superfamily: Lorisoidea
Family: Lorisidae (lorises, bushbabies)
Genus: Arctocebus
 Golden angwantibo, Arctocebus aureus LR/nt
Genus: Perodicticus
 Potto, Perodicticus potto LR/lc
Family: GalagidaeGenus: Sciurocheirus Bioko Allen's bushbaby, Sciurocheirus alleni LR/nt
Genus: Galago Senegal bushbaby, Galago senegalensis LR/lc
Genus: Galagoides Prince Demidoff's bushbaby, Galagoides demidovii LR/lc
Genus: Euoticus Southern needle-clawed bushbaby, Euoticus elegantulus LR/nt
Suborder: Haplorhini
Infraorder: Simiiformes
Parvorder: Catarrhini
Superfamily: Cercopithecoidea
Family: Cercopithecidae (Old World monkeys)
 Genus Allenopithecus Allen's swamp monkey, Allenopithecus nigroviridisGenus: Erythrocebus Patas monkey, Erythrocebus patas LR/lc
Genus: Chlorocebus Tantalus monkey, Chlorocebus tantalus LR/lc
Genus: Cercopithecus Red-tailed monkey, Cercopithecus ascanius LR/lc
 Moustached guenon, Cercopithecus cephus LR/lc
 De Brazza's monkey, Cercopithecus neglectus LR/lc
 Greater spot-nosed monkey, Cercopithecus nictitans LR/lc
 Crowned guenon, Cercopithecus pogonias LR/lc
Genus: Lophocebus Grey-cheeked mangabey, Lophocebus albigena LR/lc
Genus: Papio Olive baboon, Papio anubis LR/lc
Subfamily: Colobinae
Genus: Colobus Mantled guereza, Colobus guereza LR/lc
Genus: Procolobus Red colobus, Procolobus badius EN
Superfamily: Hominoidea
Family: Hominidae (great apes)
Subfamily: Homininae
Tribe: Gorillini
Genus: Gorilla Western gorilla, Gorilla gorilla EN
Tribe: Panini
Genus: Pan Common chimpanzee, Pan troglodytes EN

 Order: Rodentia (rodents) 

Rodents make up the largest order of mammals, with over 40% of mammalian species. They have two incisors in the upper and lower jaw which grow continually and must be kept short by gnawing.

Suborder: Hystricognathi
Family: Bathyergidae
Genus: Cryptomys Ochre mole-rat, Cryptomys ochraceocinereus DD
Family: Hystricidae (Old World porcupines)
Genus: Hystrix Crested porcupine, Hystrix cristata LC
Suborder: Sciurognathi
Family: Anomaluridae
Subfamily: Anomalurinae
Genus: Anomalurus Lord Derby's scaly-tailed squirrel, Anomalurus derbianus LC
 Dwarf scaly-tailed squirrel, Anomalurus pusillus LC
Subfamily: Zenkerellinae
Genus: Idiurus Flying mouse, Idiurus zenkeri DD
Genus: Zenkerella Flightless scaly-tailed squirrel, Zenkerella insignis DD
Family: Sciuridae (squirrels)
Subfamily: Xerinae
Tribe: Xerini
Genus: Xerus Striped ground squirrel, Xerus erythropus LC
Tribe: Protoxerini
Genus: Funisciurus Thomas's rope squirrel, Funisciurus anerythrus DD
 Lady Burton's rope squirrel, Funisciurus isabella LC
 Red-cheeked rope squirrel, Funisciurus leucogenys DD
Genus: Heliosciurus Gambian sun squirrel, Heliosciurus gambianus LC
 Red-legged sun squirrel, Heliosciurus rufobrachium LC
Genus: Protoxerus Forest giant squirrel, Protoxerus stangeri LC
Family: Gliridae (dormice)
Subfamily: Graphiurinae
Genus: Graphiurus Nagtglas's African dormouse, Graphiurus nagtglasii LC
 Kellen's dormouse, Graphiurus kelleni LC
Family: Nesomyidae
Subfamily: Dendromurinae
Genus: Prionomys Dollman's tree mouse, Prionomys batesi DD
Subfamily: Cricetomyinae
Genus: Cricetomys Emin's pouched rat, Cricetomys emini LC
 Gambian pouched rat, Cricetomys gambianus LC
Family: Muridae (mice, rats, voles, gerbils, hamsters, etc.)
Subfamily: Deomyinae
Genus: Deomys Link rat, Deomys ferrugineus LC
Genus: Lophuromys Fire-bellied brush-furred rat, Lophuromys nudicaudus LC
 Rusty-bellied brush-furred rat, Lophuromys sikapusi LC
Genus: Uranomys Rudd's mouse, Uranomys ruddi LC
Subfamily: Gerbillinae
Genus: Tatera Kemp's gerbil, Tatera kempi LC
 Fringe-tailed gerbil, Tatera robusta LC
Genus: Taterillus Congo gerbil, Taterillus congicus LC
 Harrington's gerbil, Taterillus harringtoni LC
Subfamily: Murinae
Genus: Aethomys Hinde's rock rat, Aethomys hindei LC
Genus: Arvicanthis African grass rat, Arvicanthis niloticus LC
 Guinean grass rat, Arvicanthis rufinus LC
Genus: Grammomys Macmillan's thicket rat, Grammomys macmillani LC
 Shining thicket rat, Grammomys rutilans LC
Genus: Heimyscus African smoky mouse, Heimyscus fumosus LC
Genus: Hybomys Peters's striped mouse, Hybomys univittatus LC
Genus: Hylomyscus Beaded wood mouse, Hylomyscus aeta LC
 Little wood mouse, Hylomyscus parvus LC
 Stella wood mouse, Hylomyscus stella LC
Genus: Malacomys Big-eared swamp rat, Malacomys longipes LC
Genus: Mastomys Guinea multimammate mouse, Mastomys erythroleucus LC
 Natal multimammate mouse, Mastomys natalensis LC
Genus: Mus Gounda mouse, Mus goundae DD
 African pygmy mouse, Mus minutoides LC
 Oubangui mouse, Mus oubanguii DD
 Peters's mouse, Mus setulosus LC
Genus: Mylomys African groove-toothed rat, Mylomys dybowskii LC
Genus: Myomyscus Brockman's rock mouse, Myomyscus brockmani LC
Genus: Oenomys Common rufous-nosed rat, Oenomys hypoxanthus LC
Genus: Praomys Dalton's mouse, Praomys daltoni LC
 Jackson's soft-furred mouse, Praomys jacksoni LC
 Petter's soft-furred mouse, Praomys petteri LC
Genus: Stochomys Target rat, Stochomys longicaudatus LC
Genus: Zelotomys Hildegarde's broad-headed mouse, Zelotomys hildegardeae LC

 Order: Lagomorpha (lagomorphs) 

The lagomorphs comprise two families, Leporidae (hares and rabbits), and Ochotonidae (pikas). Though they can resemble rodents, and were classified as a superfamily in that order until the early 20th century, they have since been considered a separate order. They differ from rodents in a number of physical characteristics, such as having four incisors in the upper jaw rather than two.

Family: Leporidae (rabbits, hares)
Genus: Poelagus Bunyoro rabbit, Poelagus marjorita LR/lc
Genus: Lepus Cape hare, Lepus capensis LR/lc

 Order: Erinaceomorpha (hedgehogs and gymnures) 

The order Erinaceomorpha contains a single family, Erinaceidae, which comprise the hedgehogs and gymnures. The hedgehogs are easily recognised by their spines while gymnures look more like large rats.

Family: Erinaceidae (hedgehogs)
Subfamily: Erinaceinae
Genus: Atelerix Four-toed hedgehog, Atelerix albiventris LR/lc

 Order: Soricomorpha (shrews, moles, and solenodons) 

The "shrew-forms" are insectivorous mammals. The shrews and solenodons closely resemble mice while the moles are stout-bodied burrowers.

Family: Soricidae (shrews)
Subfamily: Crocidurinae
Genus: Crocidura Hun shrew, Crocidura attila LC
 Long-footed shrew, Crocidura crenata LC
 Dent's shrew, Crocidura denti LC
 Long-tailed musk shrew, Crocidura dolichura LC
 Fox's shrew, Crocidura foxi LC
 Savanna shrew, Crocidura fulvastra LC
 Bicolored musk shrew, Crocidura fuscomurina LC
 Goliath shrew, Crocidura goliath LC
 Grasse's shrew, Crocidura grassei LC
 Hildegarde's shrew, Crocidura hildegardeae LC
 Butiaba naked-tailed shrew, Crocidura littoralis LC
 Ludia's shrew, Crocidura ludia LC
 African black shrew, Crocidura nigrofusca LC
 Small-footed shrew, Crocidura parvipes LC
 Roosevelt's shrew, Crocidura roosevelti LC
 Turbo shrew, Crocidura turba LC
 Voi shrew, Crocidura voi LC
 Yankari shrew, Crocidura yankariensis LC
Genus: Paracrocidura Lesser large-headed shrew, Paracrocidura schoutedeni LC
Genus: Suncus Least dwarf shrew, Suncus infinitesimus LC
 Remy's pygmy shrew, Suncus remyi LC
Genus: Sylvisorex Johnston's forest shrew, Sylvisorex johnstoni LC
 Kongana shrew, Sylvisorex konganensis DD
 Climbing shrew, Sylvisorex megalura LC
 Greater forest shrew, Sylvisorex ollula LC
Subfamily: Myosoricinae
Genus: Congosorex Lesser Congo shrew, Congosorex verheyeni LC

 Order: Chiroptera (bats) 

The bats' most distinguishing feature is that their forelimbs are developed as wings, making them the only mammals capable of flight. Bat species account for about 20% of all mammals.

Family: Pteropodidae (flying foxes, Old World fruit bats)
Subfamily: Pteropodinae
Genus: Casinycteris Short-palated fruit bat, Casinycteris argynnis NT
Genus: Eidolon Straw-coloured fruit bat, Eidolon helvum LC
Genus: Epomophorus Gambian epauletted fruit bat, Epomophorus gambianus LC
Genus: Epomops Franquet's epauletted fruit bat, Epomops franqueti LC
Genus: Hypsignathus Hammer-headed bat, Hypsignathus monstrosus LC
Genus: Lissonycteris Angolan rousette, Lissonycteris angolensis LC
Genus: Micropteropus Peters's dwarf epauletted fruit bat, Micropteropus pusillus LC
Genus: Myonycteris Little collared fruit bat, Myonycteris torquata LC
Genus: Nanonycteris Veldkamp's dwarf epauletted fruit bat, Nanonycteris veldkampi LC
Genus: Scotonycteris Zenker's fruit bat, Scotonycteris zenkeri NT
Subfamily: Macroglossinae
Genus: Megaloglossus Woermann's bat, Megaloglossus woermanni LC
Family: Vespertilionidae
Subfamily: Kerivoulinae
Genus: Kerivoula Lesser woolly bat, Kerivoula lanosa LC
Subfamily: Myotinae
Genus: Myotis Rufous mouse-eared bat, Myotis bocagii LC
Subfamily: Vespertilioninae
Genus: Glauconycteris Beatrix's bat, Glauconycteris beatrix NT
 Allen's spotted bat, Glauconycteris humeralis DD
Genus: Mimetillus Moloney's mimic bat, Mimetillus moloneyi LC
Genus: Neoromicia Cape serotine, Neoromicia capensis LC
 Tiny serotine, Neoromicia guineensis LC
 Banana pipistrelle, Neoromicia nanus LC
 Rendall's serotine, Neoromicia rendalli LC
 Somali serotine, Neoromicia somalicus LC
Genus: Nycticeinops Schlieffen's bat, Nycticeinops schlieffeni LC
Genus: Pipistrellus Tiny pipistrelle, Pipistrellus nanulus LC
 Rüppell's pipistrelle, Pipistrellus rueppelli LC
 Rusty pipistrelle, Pipistrellus rusticus LC
Genus: Scotoecus Dark-winged lesser house bat, Scotoecus hirundo DD
Genus: Scotophilus African yellow bat, Scotophilus dinganii LC
 White-bellied yellow bat, Scotophilus leucogaster LC
 Greenish yellow bat, Scotophilus viridis LC
Subfamily: Miniopterinae
Genus: Miniopterus Greater long-fingered bat, Miniopterus inflatus LC
Family: Rhinopomatidae
Genus: Rhinopoma Greater mouse-tailed bat, Rhinopoma microphyllum LC
Family: Molossidae
Genus: Chaerephon Duke of Abruzzi's free-tailed bat, Chaerephon aloysiisabaudiae NT
 Gland-tailed free-tailed bat, Chaerephon bemmeleni LC
Genus: Mops Sierra Leone free-tailed bat, Mops brachypterus LC
 Midas free-tailed bat, Mops midas LC
 Spurrell's free-tailed bat, Mops spurrelli LC
 Railer bat, Mops thersites LC
 Trevor's free-tailed bat, Mops trevori VU
Genus: Myopterus Daubenton's free-tailed bat, Myopterus daubentonii NT
 Bini free-tailed bat, Myopterus whitleyi LC
Genus: Otomops Large-eared free-tailed bat, Otomops martiensseni NT
Family: Emballonuridae
Genus: Coleura African sheath-tailed bat, Coleura afra LC
Genus: Taphozous Mauritian tomb bat, Taphozous mauritianus LC
Family: Nycteridae
Genus: Nycteris Large slit-faced bat, Nycteris grandis LC
 Hairy slit-faced bat, Nycteris hispida LC
 Large-eared slit-faced bat, Nycteris macrotis LC
 Ja slit-faced bat, Nycteris major VU
 Dwarf slit-faced bat, Nycteris nana LC
 Egyptian slit-faced bat, Nycteris thebaica LC
Family: Megadermatidae
Genus: Lavia Yellow-winged bat, Lavia frons LC
Family: Rhinolophidae
Subfamily: Rhinolophinae
Genus: Rhinolophus Rüppell's horseshoe bat, Rhinolophus fumigatus LC
 Lander's horseshoe bat, Rhinolophus landeri LC
Subfamily: Hipposiderinae
Genus: Hipposideros Aba roundleaf bat, Hipposideros abae NT
 Benito roundleaf bat, Hipposideros beatus LC
 Cyclops roundleaf bat, Hipposideros cyclops LC
 Giant roundleaf bat, Hipposideros gigas LC
 Commerson's roundleaf bat, Hipposideros marungensis NT
 Noack's roundleaf bat, Hipposideros ruber LC
Genus: Triaenops Persian trident bat, Triaenops persicus LC

 Order: Pholidota (pangolins) 

The order Pholidota comprises the eight species of pangolin. Pangolins are anteaters and have the powerful claws, elongated snout and long tongue seen in the other unrelated anteater species.

Family: Manidae
Genus: Manis Giant pangolin, Manis gigantea LR/lc
 Ground pangolin, Manis temminckii LR/nt
 Long-tailed pangolin, Manis tetradactyla LR/lc
 Tree pangolin, Manis tricuspis LR/lc

 Order: Carnivora (carnivorans) 

There are over 260 species of carnivorans, the majority of which feed primarily on meat. They have a characteristic skull shape and dentition.
Suborder: Feliformia
Family: Felidae (cats)
Subfamily: Felinae
Genus: Acinonyx Cheetah, A. jubatus 
Northwest African cheetah, A. j. hecki 
Genus: CaracalAfrican golden cat, C. aurata 
Caracal, C. caracal 
Genus: LeptailurusServal, L. serval 
Subfamily: Pantherinae
Genus: Panthera Lion, P. leo 
Leopard, P. pardus 
Family: Viverridae
Subfamily: Viverrinae
Genus: CivettictisAfrican civet, C. civetta 
Genus: GenettaCommon genet, G. genetta 
 Rusty-spotted genet, G. maculata 
 Servaline genet, G. servalina 
Genus: PoianaCentral African oyan, P. richardsonii 
Family: Nandiniidae
Genus: NandiniaAfrican palm civet, N. binotata 
Family: Herpestidae (mongooses)
Genus: Crossarchus Alexander's kusimanse, C. alexandri 
Genus: Dologale Pousargues's mongoose, D. dybowskii 
Genus: Herpestes Common slender mongoose, H. sanguineus 
Genus: IchneumiaWhite-tailed mongoose, I. albicauda 
Genus: Mungos Banded mongoose, M. mungo 
Family: Hyaenidae (hyaenas)
Genus: Crocuta Spotted hyena, C. crocuta 
Genus: HyaenaStriped hyena, H. hyaena 
Suborder: Caniformia
Family: Canidae (dogs, foxes)
Genus: CanisAfrican golden wolf, C. lupaster 
Genus: Lupulella Side-striped jackal, L. adusta  
Genus: Lycaon African wild dog, L. pictus 
Family: Mustelidae (mustelids)
Genus: Ictonyx Striped polecat, I. striatus 
Genus: MellivoraHoney badger, M. capensis 
Genus: Hydrictis Speckle-throated otter, H. maculicollis 

 Order: Artiodactyla (even-toed ungulates) 

The even-toed ungulates are ungulates whose weight is borne about equally by the third and fourth toes, rather than mostly or entirely by the third as in perissodactyls. There are about 220 artiodactyl species, including many that are of great economic importance to humans.
Family: Suidae (pigs)
Subfamily: Phacochoerinae
Genus: Phacochoerus Common warthog, Phacochoerus africanus LR/lc
Subfamily: Suinae
Genus: Hylochoerus Giant forest hog, Hylochoerus meinertzhageni LR/lc
Genus: Potamochoerus Red river hog, Potamochoerus porcus LR/lc
Family: Hippopotamidae (hippopotamuses)
Genus: HippopotamusHippopotamus, H. amphibius  
Family: Tragulidae
Genus: Hyemoschus Water chevrotain, Hyemoschus aquaticus DD
Family: Giraffidae (giraffe, okapi)
Genus: Giraffa Kordofan giraffe, Giraffa camelopardalis antiquorum EN
Family: Bovidae (cattle, antelope, sheep, goats)
Subfamily: Alcelaphinae
Genus: Alcelaphus Hartebeest, Alcelaphus buselaphus LR/cd
Genus: Damaliscus Topi, Damaliscus lunatus LR/cd
Subfamily: Antilopinae
Genus: Gazella Red-fronted gazelle, Gazella rufifrons VU
Genus: Neotragus Bates's pygmy antelope, Neotragus batesi LR/nt
Genus: Oreotragus Klipspringer, Oreotragus oreotragus LR/cd
Genus: Ourebia Oribi, Ourebia ourebi LR/cd
Subfamily: Bovinae
Genus: Syncerus African buffalo, Syncerus caffer LR/cd
Genus: Tragelaphus Giant eland, Tragelaphus derbianus LR/nt
 Bongo, Tragelaphus eurycerus LR/nt
 Bushbuck, Tragelaphus scriptus LR/lc
 Sitatunga, Tragelaphus spekii LR/nt
 Greater kudu, Tragelaphus strepsiceros LR/cd
Subfamily: Cephalophinae
Genus: Cephalophus Peters's duiker, Cephalophus callipygus LR/nt
 Bay duiker, Cephalophus dorsalis LR/nt
 White-bellied duiker, Cephalophus leucogaster LR/nt
 Blue duiker, Cephalophus monticola LR/lc
 Black-fronted duiker, Cephalophus nigrifrons LR/nt
 Red-flanked duiker, Cephalophus rufilatus LR/cd
 Yellow-backed duiker, Cephalophus silvicultor LR/nt
Genus: Sylvicapra Common duiker, Sylvicapra grimmia LR/lc
Subfamily: Hippotraginae
Genus: Hippotragus Roan antelope, Hippotragus equinus LR/cd
Subfamily: Reduncinae
Genus: Kobus Waterbuck, Kobus ellipsiprymnus LR/cd
 Kob, Kobus kob LR/cd
Genus: Redunca Bohor reedbuck, Redunca redunca'' LR/cd

See also
List of chordate orders
Lists of mammals by region
List of prehistoric mammals
Mammal classification
List of mammals described in the 2000s

Notes

References
 

Central African Republic
Central African Republic
Mammals